The 1979 Australian Touring Car Championship was a CAMS sanctioned Australian motor racing title open to Group C Touring Cars. It began at Symmons Plains and ended at Adelaide International Raceway after eight rounds. The title, which was the 20th Australian Touring Car Championship, was won by Bob Morris driving a Holden Torana.

1979 was the first time since the ATCC went to a championship series in 1969 rather than the single race it had been previously that a single make and model car had won all rounds of the championship with all 8 rounds being won by the Holden LX Torana SS A9X Hatchback. Including the current season (2016), such a single car domination has only happened once since in the series, that being when the Ford Sierra RS500 won all rounds of the 1988 championship.

Calendar

The 1979 Australian Touring Car Championship was contested over an eight-round series.

 Round 3 of the championship at Oran Park featured two separate races, the first for Under 3 litre cars and the second for Over 3 litre cars.

Teams and drivers
The following teams and drivers competed in the 1979 Australian Touring Car Championship.

Classes
For championship points allocation purposes, cars competed in two displacement classes:
 Up to and including 3000 cc
 3001 to 6000 cc

Points system
Championship points were awarded on a 9,6,4,3,2,1 basis to the first six placegetters in each class and on a 4,3,2,1 basis to the first four placegetters irrespective of class (at each round). Only the best seven results counted towards the total (for each driver).

Championship results

Drivers marked with a * competed in the under 3000 cc class.

References

Australian Touring Car Championship seasons
Touring Cars